Yager Stadium can refer to one of several sports stadiums:
 Yager Stadium (Miami University) named for Fred C. Yager, located in Oxford, Ohio, USA
 Yager Stadium at Moore Bowl named for Gary Yager, located in Topeka, Kansas, USA